Second War of Independence may refer to:

War of 1812
Second Italian War of Independence
Second War of Scottish Independence

See also
Second American Revolution
War of Independence (disambiguation)
First War of Independence (disambiguation)
Second Battle of Independence